The 1969 La Paz Lloyd Aéreo Boliviano Douglas DC-6 crash, also known as The Viloco tragedy was an accident involving a Douglas DC-6B of the Bolivian airline Lloyd Aéreo Boliviano into Mount Choquetanga, 176 km (110 miles) southeast of La Paz, Bolivia, on 26 September 1969, killing all 74 people on board. Including 17 members of a Bolivian association football team named The Strongest.

Accident
The Lloyd Aéreo Boliviano Douglas DC-6B took off from Santa Cruz-El Trompillo Airport, Bolivia on a scheduled flight to La Paz-El Alto Airport, Bolivia carrying 5 crew and 69 passengers, including 17 members of a Bolivian football team named The Strongest on 26 September 1969. Around 3.10pm while cruising at an altitude of 
, the plane crashed into a slope of Mount Choquetanga, 176 km (110 miles) southeast of La Paz, Bolivia. The wreckage was found after a three day search where it was also discovered that there were no survivors.

Aircraft
The Douglas DC-6B involved, CP-698 (msn 43273/191) was built in 1951 and was used by Lloyd Aéreo Boliviano from 1951 until its destruction in 1969.

Aftermath
The aircraft was destroyed in the crash killing all 74 people on board including the seventeen Bolivian football players. Their deaths let the event become known as The Viloco tragedy. An investigation of the accident did not reveal any reason or clues as to why the plane crashed, although it was speculated that there was a possibility of controlled flight into terrain due to possible weather conditions and poor visibility.

References

Airliner accidents and incidents with an unknown cause
Airliner accidents and incidents involving controlled flight into terrain
1969 in Bolivia
Aviation accidents and incidents in 1969
Accidents and incidents involving the Douglas DC-6
Aviation accidents and incidents in Bolivia
History of Bolivia
1969 disasters in Bolivia